MMA Junkie is a news website that covers the sport of mixed martial arts (MMA). It was founded in 2006, and is owned by Gannett Company since 2011. The site and its content have been featured in Time magazine, ESPN The Magazine, The New York Times, Fox Sports Net's The Best Damn Sports Show Period, Fox Report w/ Shepard Smith, Inside MMA, ESPN's MMA Live, Yahoo! and other media outlets.

Overview

A variety of guest columnists and bloggers have been featured such as Ryan Bader (The Ultimate Fighter 8), C.B. Dollaway (The Ultimate Fighter 7) and Brendan Schaub (The Ultimate Fighter 10).

Radio show
MMAjunkie Radio is a weekly Internet radio show broadcast from Las Vegas, Nevada. MMAjunkie Radio resulted from the acquisition and re-branding of TAGG Radio (Trigg And Gorgeous George), which launched in 2007 and formed a content partnership with MMAjunkie in 2008. The live Internet radio show and podcast was renamed MMAjunkie Radio in early 2009.

Hosted by "Gorgeous" George Garcia, Brian "Goze" Garcia and MMAjunkie lead staff reporter John Morgan, the show broadcasts Monday-Friday with occasional weekend and evening "Primetime" specials. Although once produced from a home studio, the show moved in 2009 to its new studio at the Race & Sports Book inside The Mandalay Bay Resort & Casino, "Where Eligance and Excitement meet on the Las Vegas Strip".

The two-hour show is a guest-driven program that features some of the most prominent fighters, trainers, promoters and officials in the sport. Additionally, Morgan and other members of the MMAjunkie editorial team frequently discuss and break the latest MMA news on the program.

Upon its initial launch, TAGG Radio became the first radio show co-hosted by an active MMA fighter, though Frank Trigg ultimately had to resign his post due to his UFC contract stipulations. Trainer Marc Laimon has since become a frequent co-host, and veteran fighter Don Frye is an occasional contributor with his humorous "Don Frye-days" personal advice segments.

Awards
The website has won Fighters Only Magazine's World Mixed Martial Arts Awards for 2008 Best Media Coverage, 2009 Best Media Coverage, 2009 Best MMA Journalist (John Morgan), 2010 Media Source of the Year, 2011 Media Source of the Year, and 2014 Media Source of the Year.

See also
 ESPN
 Fightmag
 Inside MMA
 MMA Fighting
 Sherdog
 Bloody Elbow

References

External links
 

Mixed martial arts websites
Internet properties established in 2006